Agersø is a Danish island in the Great Belt close to Zealand. The island covers an area of 6.84 km2 and has 174 inhabitants (2016).

See also
 List of Danish islands
 Sydhavsøerne

References

External links 

Danish islands in the Baltic
Islands of Denmark
Geography of Slagelse Municipality